The Divine Nymph is a 1975 Italian drama film directed by Giuseppe Patroni Griffi and starring Laura Antonelli, Marcello Mastroianni, Michele Placido and Terence Stamp. It was entered into the 26th Berlin International Film Festival. It was distributed in the U.S. by Analysis Film Releasing Corp.

Plot
During the Roaring Twenties, a beautiful woman (Laura Antonelli) is engaged to one man, but has an affair with both a young nobleman (Terence Stamp) and later his cousin (Marcello Mastroianni), playing them against each other.

Cast
 Laura Antonelli - Manoela Roderighi
 Terence Stamp - Dany di Bagnasco
 Michele Placido - Martino Ghiondelli
 Duilio Del Prete - Armellini
 Ettore Manni - Marco Pisani
 Carlo Tamberlani - Majordomo Pasqualino
 Cecilia Polizzi - Dany's Maid
 Piero Di Iorio - Cameriere di Stefano
 Marina Berti - Manoela's Aunt
 Doris Duranti - Signora Fones
 Marcello Mastroianni - Michele Barra
 Tina Aumont
 Rita Silva
 Corrado Annicelli
 Gino Cassani

See also    
 List of Italian films of 1975

References

External links

1975 films
1970s Italian-language films
English-language Italian films
1970s English-language films
1975 drama films
Films directed by Giuseppe Patroni Griffi
Films set in Rome
Films scored by Ennio Morricone
Italian drama films
1975 multilingual films
Italian multilingual films
1970s Italian films